Frederick James Skinner (April 8, 1867 – November 5, 1933) was an Ontario manufacturer and political figure, who represented Leeds in the Legislative Assembly of Ontario as a Conservative member from 1926 until his death in 1933.

The son of Sylvester Case Skinner, he was born and educated in his hometown of Gananoque, Ontario. In 1894, he married Bertha Van Heuson. He was president and general manager of the Skinner Company Limited, established by his father, which manufactured various farm tools and hardware for carriages. Under Skinner's management, the company began to manufacture metal bumpers for vehicles. During World War I, its production was converted to small hardware for use by the armed forces. After the war, the plant manufactured automobile bumpers. In 1929, the company was sold to the Houdaille-Hershey Corporation in 1929, although Skinner continued to serve as president. In 1930, the plant was moved to Oshawa. Skinner died in 1933 and his son Frederick Van Heusen Skinner took over the company as the president.

References 
 Canadian Parliamentary Guide, 1928, AL Normandin

External links 

History of Houdaille Industries, Ontario previously known as Skinner Company Limited

1867 births
1933 deaths
Progressive Conservative Party of Ontario MPPs